Elchin Ismayilov (born 27 September 1982, in Baku, Azerbaijan SSR, Soviet Union) is an Azerbaijani judoka.

Achievements

References

External links
 

1982 births
Living people
Azerbaijani male judoka
Judoka at the 2000 Summer Olympics
Judoka at the 2004 Summer Olympics
Olympic judoka of Azerbaijan
21st-century Azerbaijani people